A democracy voucher is a method of public financing of political campaigns used in municipal elections in Seattle, Washington, United States. It was approved in 2015 and debuted during the 2017 election cycle. The program provides city residents with four vouchers, each worth $25, that can be pledged to eligible candidates running for municipal offices. It is funded by a property tax and is applied on a first-come, first-served  basis.

Implementation

Seattle

The Seattle democracy voucher program was approved in a 2015 citywide referendum. Municipal elections in 2017 were the first year the program was implemented. It is the first program of its kind in the United States.

Under the program, each registered voter in Seattle received four $25 vouchers which they were eligible to give to any eligible candidates standing for election to municipal office (other Seattle residents who would normally be eligible to donate to campaigns could request vouchers as well). To be eligible, candidates must have
 already raised between $1,500 and $6,000 from a minimum number of donors;
 agreed to campaign finance restrictions, including accepting no more than $250 of non-voucher funds from any individual contributor (or $500 for candidates standing for the office of mayor), and
 agreed to cap campaign spending to a determined limit. In addition, participating candidates must not have received any contributions from a person or organization with more than $250,000 in service contracts with the city. People who are not eligible to vote, such as permanent residents, were also eligible.

Seattle City Council members serve 4-year terms, with roughly half of the seats contested every other year.  The program was funded by a $3 million citywide increase in the property tax. The system was "first come, first served", with just 47,000 vouchers honored.

The 2021 election was the first mayoral election to use democracy vouchers. During the primary election, the number of city residents contributing financially to election campaigns increased from 1.5 percent in 2017 to 3.6 percent in 2021.

Other governments

A similar plan was put forward by the 2020 presidential campaign of Andrew Yang. The campaign's "Democracy Dollars" would have given each registered voter $100 to put towards the political campaign of their choice annually.

In 2016 in a statewide ballot initiative, South Dakota voters supported a bill that included provisions for democracy vouchers as part of a larger ethics reform bill called "the government accountability and anti-corruption act". The democracy voucher part of this bill provided voters two $50-dollar vouchers to be given to state candidates. The bill passed with over 51% of the vote, but South Dakota Republicans repealed the bill in early 2017. An "emergency clause" was included in the repeal preventing resubmission of the ballot initiative.

Response
Supporters argue that the program makes campaign donors more representative of the overall population, lets candidates fundraise for competitive campaigns without relying on big money, and limits the influence of special interests over elected officials.

Opponents claimed that, because the vouchers would be distributed ten months before the general election and were assigned on a first come, first served basis, the program would largely benefit incumbent political candidates rather than challengers, because the latter typically launch their campaigns at a later date than incumbents. As a result, incumbents might receive all funds from the program, with available money completely depleted by the time challengers were able to organize campaigns.

See also
 Government and politics of Seattle
 Washington State Public Disclosure Commission

References

External links 

 Democracy voucher program City of Seattle website

Campaign finance in the United States
Seattle